Buna may refer to:

Places
 Buna village, a small Bosnia and Herzegovina village at the confluence of the Buna and Neretva rivers 
 Buna, Kenya, captured by Italy in the East African Campaign
 Bouna, Ivory Coast or Buna
 Buna, Papua New Guinea, a village in Oro Province, Papua New Guinea
 Buna Airfield, an aerodrome located near Buna, Papua New Guinea
 Buna, Texas, a census-designated place in Jasper County
 Bună Ziua, Cluj-Napoca, a housing district in Romania
 Monowitz concentration camp, or Buna, a Nazi concentration camp run during WWII

Rivers and other waterbodies
 Bojana (river), in Albania and Montenegro
 Buna (Neretva), a Neretva tributary in Bosnia and Herzegovina
 Buna Bay, a bay and port of Papua New Guinea

Languages
 Buna language, a Torricelli language of Papua New Guinea
 Mbum language or Buna language, an Adamawa language of Cameroon

Rubber
 Buna rubber, tradename for Polybutadiene, a synthetic rubber
 Buna Werke Schkopau, a former IG Farben synthetic rubber plant near Halle (Saale), Germany, later 
 Monowitz Buna Werke, a former IG Farben synthetic rubber plant with an attached Nazi German labor camp near Oswiecim, Poland

Ships
 HMAS Buna (L 132), a Balikpapan-class heavy landing craft operated by the Royal Australian Navy
 JDS Buna (PF-294), a Tacoma-class frigate operated by the Japan Maritime Self-Defense Force

People
 Buna Lawrie, an Australian Aboriginal musician

Other uses
 Buna maflat, the Ethiopian coffee ceremony
 HD 16175 or Buna, a star
 Fagus crenata or buna, a deciduous tree of the beech family
 Sac de gemecs (Andorran: Buna), a type of bagpipe in Catalonia

See also